The R532 is a Regional Route in South Africa.

Route
Its north-western origin is in Limpopo from the R36 between Abel Erasmus Pass to the north and Ohrigstad to the south. It initially heads east, crossing into Mpumalanga province. It then turns to a more southerly direction, on the western edge of the Blyde River Canyon Nature Reserve. It passes close to Bourke's Luck Potholes. Further south, the R534 forms a scenic detour to God's Window, also a part of the Reserve. At Graskop, the route intersects and is cosigned with the R533 heading west for 5 kilometres before continuing south to Sabie where the route ends at an intersection with the R536.

References

Regional Routes in Limpopo
Regional Routes in Mpumalanga